Terence "Terry" Giddy (born 2 April 1950) is an Australian Paralympic athlete with paraplegia, who won six medals over six Paralympics.

Personal
Giddy was born on 2 April 1950 in the New South Wales town of Kempsey, as the second of four children. He became paraplegic at the age of 15 after a tree-felling accident. He has been married to his wife Margaret since 1978, and has three stepsons and two grandchildren. He runs Big Terry's Little Gym, which has trained powerlifters who have won world titles.

Career

Giddy became involved in paralympic sport after a dare. He said "It began at a Christmas party...we were racing up and down the back lane and I said to the boss if I train a bit harder I may get to the Commonwealth Games. My boss and colleagues said if I got picked they would send me away and that's how it started."

Giddy's first national competition was the National Games in 1969, and his first international competition was the 1970 Commonwealth Paraplegic Games in Edinburgh, where he won three gold medals and a silver medal. At the 1972 Heidelberg Paralympics, he won a silver medal in the Men's 100 m Wheelchair 4 event, and also participated in the Australia men's national wheelchair basketball team. He participated in the 1974 Commonwealth Paraplegic Games in Dunedin, New Zealand,. He was selected but did not participate in the 1976 Toronto Paralympics due to illness, and also did not participate in the 1980 Arnhem Paralympics. He won a gold medal at the 1984 New York/Stoke Mandeville Paralympics in the Men's Discus 4 event, a silver medal in the same event at the 1988 Seoul Paralympics, a silver medal in the Men's Discus THW6 event and a bronze medal in the Men's Shot Put THW6 event at the 1992 Barcelona Paralympics, and a bronze medal in the Men's Shot Put F55 event at the 1996 Atlanta Paralympics.

Just before the 2000 Sydney Paralympics, his classification was changed from F56 to F55, and he was told that he had been competing in the wrong disability group for his entire career. He did not win any medals at the 2000 Games. Giddy regretted his disqualification by video footage in the shot put at the Sydney Games after throwing a world record. In 2002, while training in Germany for the world titles in France, he cracked his sternum and hurt his back in a fall. He then prepared for the 2004 Athens Paralympics, but the back injury had flared up again, and the plate in his back had broken in half. He retired in early 2004 due to the injury. He came back for the 2006 Melbourne Commonwealth Games, where he came seventh in the seated shot put, and was Australia's oldest ever Commonwealth Games athlete. At his farewell dinner in 2004, Chris Nunn, Head Coach of the Australian Athletics team at the Sydney Games, said "Whilst you may have travelled thousands of miles in economy class, your contribution has always been first class".

Recognition
In 1988, Giddy received an Advance Australia Award. In 2000, he received an Australian Sports Medal. That year, he carried the Sydney Olympic torch. He also received an Australia Day award and was given the key to the town of Kempsey. He was one of three Paralympians who campaigned about work safety for WorkCover during and after the 2000 Summer Paralympics. In 2010, his face was on the cover of the Kempsey White Pages and Yellow Pages.

References

External links
 Terence 'Terry' Giddy at Australian Athletics Historical Results
 Terry Giddy interviewed by Rob Willis and Tony Naar in the Australian Centre for Paralympic Studies oral history project, National Library of Australia, 2011

Paralympic athletes of Australia
Paralympic wheelchair basketball players of Australia
Australian male wheelchair racers
Athletes (track and field) at the 1972 Summer Paralympics
Wheelchair basketball players at the 1972 Summer Paralympics
Athletes (track and field) at the 1984 Summer Paralympics
Athletes (track and field) at the 1988 Summer Paralympics
Athletes (track and field) at the 1992 Summer Paralympics
Athletes (track and field) at the 1996 Summer Paralympics
Athletes (track and field) at the 2000 Summer Paralympics
Athletes (track and field) at the 2006 Commonwealth Games
Commonwealth Games competitors for Australia
Medalists at the 1972 Summer Paralympics
Medalists at the 1984 Summer Paralympics
Medalists at the 1988 Summer Paralympics
Medalists at the 1992 Summer Paralympics
Medalists at the 1996 Summer Paralympics
Paralympic gold medalists for Australia
Paralympic silver medalists for Australia
Paralympic bronze medalists for Australia
Paralympic medalists in athletics (track and field)
Wheelchair category Paralympic competitors
Sportsmen from New South Wales
People with paraplegia
Recipients of the Australian Sports Medal
1950 births
Living people